Ciliata may refer to:

 The ciliates, a group of ciliated protists
 Ciliata (fish), a genus of fishes in the family Lotidae